KCON (92.7 MHz) is an FM radio station broadcasting an adult hits format. Licensed to Vilonia, Arkansas, United States, it serves the Little Rock area. The station is currently owned by East Arkansas Broadcasters, through licensee EAB of Morrilton, LLC. Its studios are in Conway, and the transmitter is in Magness.

History
KCON started out in 1984 as KTOD-FM. Known as "The Voice of Toadsuck Country", it aired a country music format. Over the years, the station also played an adult contemporary music format in 1992, before changing to its current sports format. The call sign was changed to KASR, for "Arkansas Sports Radio", in 1996.

Effective April 30, 2021, Creative Media sold KASR to East Arkansas Broadcasters for $525,000. With no change in format or imaging, the call letters were switched with KCON (99.3 FM) in Atkins on August 1, 2021, placing the KCON designation closer to Conway, where an AM station had previously used them.

References

External links

Jack FM stations
Adult hits radio stations in the United States
CON (FM)
Radio stations established in 1985
1985 establishments in Arkansas
Faulkner County, Arkansas